Jerzy Dzik (born 25 February 1950) is a Polish paleontologist.

He has described many species, genera, and families of conodonts, including the order Ozarkodinida (in 1976).

In 2003, he described the dinosauriform Silesaurus, from the Triassic of Poland.

Tributes 
The conodont genus name Dzikodus Zhang 1998 is a tribute to J. Dzik.

References 

 Dzik, J. 1975a. Spiroboloid millipeds from the Late Cretaceous of the Gobi Desert, Mongolia. Palaeontologia Polonica 33, 17-24.
 Dzik, J. 1975b. The origin and early phylogeny of the cheilostomatous Bryozoa. Acta Palaeontologica Polonica 20, 3, 395-423.

 Dzik, J. 1978a. A myodocopid ostracode with preserved appendages from the Upper Jurassic of the Volga River Region (USSR). Neues Jahrbuch für Geologie und Paläontologie, Monatshefte 1978, 7, 393-399.
 Dzik, J. 1978b. Larval development of hyolithids. Lethaia 11, 3, 293-299.
 Dzik, J. 1978c. Conodont biostratigraphy and paleogeographical relations of the Ordovician Mójcza Limestone (Holy Cross Mts., Poland). Acta Palaeontologica Polonica 23, 1, 51-72.
 Dzik, J. & Jażdżewski, K. 1978. The euphausiid species of the Antarctic region. Polskie Archiwum Hydrobiologii 25, 3, 589-605.
 Jażdżewski, K., Dzik, J., Porębski, J., Rakusa-Suszczewski, S., Witek, Z., & Wolnomiejski, N. 1978. Biological and populational studies on krill near South Shetland Islands, Scotia Sea and South Georgia in the summer 1976. Polskie Archiwum Hydrobiologii 25, 3, 607-631
 Dzik, J. 1979. Some terebratulid populations from the Lower Kimmeridgian of Poland and their relations to the biotic environment. Acta Palaeontologica Polonica 24, 4, 473-492.
 Pisera, A. & Dzik, J. 1979. Tithonian crinoids from Rogoźnik (Pieniny Klippen Belt, Poland) and their evolutionary relationships. Eclogae geologicae Helvetiae 72, 3, 805-849.
 Dzik, J. 1980a. Isolated mandibles of early Palaeozoic phyllocarid Crustacea. Neues Jahrbuch für Geologie und Paläontologie, Monatshefte 1980, 2, 87-106.
 Dzik, J. 1980b. Ontogeny of Bactrotheca and related hyoliths. Geologiska Föreningen i Stockholm Förhandlingar 102, 3, 223-233.
 Dzik, J. & Trammer, J. 1980. Gradual evolution of conodontophorids in the Polish Triassic. Acta Palaeontologica Polonica 25, 1, 55-89.
 Dzik, J. 1981b. An Early Triassic millipede from Siberia and its evolutionary significance. Neues Jahrbuch für Geologie und Paläontologie, Monatshefte 1981, 7, 395-404.
 Dzik, J. 1981c. Evolutionary relationships of Early Palaeozoic 'cyclostomatous' Bryozoa. Palaeontology 24, 4, 827-861.
 Dzik, J. 1981d. Origin of the Cephalopoda. Acta Palaeontologica Polonica 26, 2, 161-191.[ABSTRACT] 
 Dzik. J, 1981e. Larval development, musculature, and relationships of Sinuitopsis and related Baltic bellerophonts. Norsk Geologisk Tidsskrift 61, 111-121.
 Dzik, J. 1983a. Larval development and relationships of Mimospira - a presumably hyperstrophic Ordovician gastropod. Geologiska Föreningen i Stockholm Förhandlingar 104, 3, 231-239.
 Dzik, J. 1983b. Relationships between Baltic and North American Midcontinent Ordovician conodont faunas. Fossils and Strata 15, 59-85.
 Dzik, J. 1983c. Early Ordovician conodont biogeography of the central Europe. Geological Society of America, Abstracts with Programs 15, 208, 13214.
 Dzik, J. 1984a. Phylogeny of the Nautiloidea. Palaeontologia Polonica 45, 1-255.
 Dzik, J. 1984b. Early Ordovician conodonts from the Barrandian and Bohemian-Baltic faunal relationships. Acta Palaeontologica Polonica 28, 3, 327-368.
 Dzik, J. 1985. Typologic versus population concepts of chronospecies: implications for ammonite biostratigraphy. Acta Palaeontologica Polonica 30, 1/2, 71-92.
 Dzik, J. 1986a. Uncalcified cephalopod jaws from the Middle Jurassic of Poland. Neues Jahrbuch für Geologie und Paläontologie, Monatshefte 1986, 7, 405-417.
 Dzik, J. 1986b. Turrilepadida and other Machaeridia. In: A. Hoffman & M.H. Nitecki (eds) Problematic Fossil Taxa, 116-134. Oxford University Press, New York.
 Dzik, J. 1986c. Chordate affinities of the conodonts. In: A. Hoffman & M.H. Nitecki (eds) Problematic Fossil Taxa, 240-254. Oxford University Press, New York.
 Wake, D.B., Connor, E.F., de Ricqles, A.J., Dzik, J., Fisher, D.C., Gould, S.J., LaBarbera, M.C., Meeter, D.A., Mosbrugger, V., Reif, W.E., Rieger, R.M., Seilacher, A., & Wagner, G.P. 1986. Directions in the history of life. In: D. Raup & D. Jablonski (eds) Patterns and Processes in the History of Life, 47-67. Dahlem Konferenzen. Springer Verlag, Berlin.
 Dzik, J. & Drygant, D. 1986. The apparatus of panderodontid conodonts. Lethaia 19, 2, 133-141.
 Dzik, J. 1987. Population variability of Paleozoic nautiloids: a reply to Turek & Marek (1986). Paläontologische Zeitschrift 61, 3/4, 223-227.
 Dzik, J. & Lendzion, K. 1988. The oldest arthropods of the East European Platform. Lethaia 21, 1, 29-38.
 Dzik, J. & Krumbiegel, G. 1989. The oldest 'onychophoran' Xenusion: a link connecting phyla? Lethaia 22, 2, 169-181.
 Dzik, J. 1990a. The concept of chronospecies in ammonites. In: Pallini, G. et al. (eds.) Atti del secondo convegno internazionale Fossili Evoluzione Ambiente, Pergola 25-30 ottobre 1987, 273-289. Pergola PS.
 Dzik, J. 1990b. Conodont evolution in high latitudes of the Ordovician. Courier Forschungsinstitut Senckenberg 117, 1-28.
 Dzik, J. 1991a. Is fossil evidence consistent with traditional views of the early Metazoan phylogeny? In: S. Conway Morris & A. Simonetta (eds) The Early Evolution of Metazoa and Significance of Problematic Taxa. 47-56. Cambridge University Press.
 Dzik, J. 1991b. Ammonite Acrochordiceras in the Middle Triassic of Silesia. Acta Palaeontologica Polonica 35, 1-2, 46-65.
 Dzik, J. 1991c. Possible solitary bryozoan ancestors from the early Palaeozoic and the affinities of the Tentaculita. In: F.P. Bigey & J.-L. d'Hondt (eds) Bryozoaires actuels et fossiles: Bryozoa Living and Fossil. Societe des Sciences Naturelles de l'Ouest de la France, Memoire hors serie 1, 121-131.
 Dzik, J. 1991d. Features of the fossil record of evolution. Acta Palaeontologica Polonica 36, 2, 91-113.
 Dzik, J. 1991e. Evolution of oral apparatuses in conodont chordates. Acta Palaeontologica Polonica 36, 3, 265-323.
 Dzik, J. 1992b Early astogeny and relationships of the Ordovician rhabdomesid bryozoans. Acta Palaeontologica Polonica 37, 1, 37-54.
 Dzik, J. & Korn, D. 1992. Devonian ancestors of Nautilus. Paläontologische Zeitschrift 66, 1/2, 81-98.
 Dzik, J. 1993. Early metazoan evolution and the meaning of its fossil record. Evolutionary Biology 27, 339-386.
 Dzik. J. & Orłowski, S. 1993. The late Cambrian eocrinoid Cambrocrinus. Acta Palaeontologica Polonica 38, 1/2, 21-34.
 Dzik, J. 1994a Conodonts of the Mójcza Limestone. In: J. Dzik, E. Olempska, & A. Pisera. Ordovician carbonate platform of the Holy Cross Mountains. Palaeontologia Polonica 53, 43-128.
 Dzik, J. 1994b. Machaeridia, chitons, and conchiferan molluscs of the Mojcza Limestone. In J. Dzik, E. Olempska, & A. Pisera. Ordovician carbonate platform of the Holy Cross Mountains. Palaeontologia Polonica 53, 213-252.
 Dzik, J. 1994c. Bryozoa of the Mojcza Limestone. In: J. Dzik, E. Olempska, & A. Pisera. Ordovician carbonate platform of the Holy Cross Mountains. Palaeontologia Polonica 53, 253-282.
 Dzik, J. 1994d. Evolution of 'small shelly fossils' assemblages of the early Paleozoic. Acta Palaeontologica Polonica 38, 3, 247-313.
 Dzik, J. & Pisera, A. 1994. The Mójcza Limestone and its sedimentation. In: J. Dzik, E. Olempska, & A. Pisera. Ordovician carbonate platform ecosystem of the Holy Cross Mountains. Palaeontologia Polonica 53, 5-41.
 Dzik, J. & Kiseliev, G. 1995. The Baltic nautiloids Cyrtoceras ellipticum Lossen 1860, C. priscum Eichwald 1840, and Orthoceras damesi Krause 1870. Paläontologische Zeitschrift 69, 59-69.
 Dzik. J. 1995. Range-based biostratigraphy and evolutionary geochronology. Paleopelagos Special Publication 1, 121-128.
 Dzik. J. 1995. Sexual dimorphism in the virgatitid ammonites. Paleopelagos Special Publication 1, 129-141.
 Dzik, J. & Orłowski, S. 1995. Primitive ctenocystoid echinoderm from the earliest Middle Cambrian of Poland. Annales de Paléontologie 81, 17-35.
 Chen, J.y., Dzik, J., Edgecombe, G.D., Ramsköld, L., & Zhou, G.-q. 1995. A possible Early Cambrian chordate. Nature 377, 720-722.
 Dzik, J. 1995. Yunnanozoon and the ancestry of chordates. Acta Palaeontologica Polonica 40, 341-360. 
 Dzik, J. 1997. Emergence and succession of Carboniferous conodont and ammonoid communities in the Polish part of the Variscan sea. Acta Palaeontologica Polonica 42, 57-170.
 Dzik, J., Zhao Yuanlong, & Zhu Maoyan 1997. Mode of life of the Middle Cambrian eldonioid lophophorate Rotadiscus. Palaeontology 40, 385-396.
 Dzik, J. 1998b. Organic membraneous skeleton in the Vendian Petalonamae from Namibia. Geological Society of America Abstracts with Program, North-Central Section (No. 9771), 15.
 Dzik J. 1998c. Conodont record of the Late Ordovician glaciations of Gondwana. Geological Society of America Abstracts with Program, North-Central Section (No. 1434), 15.
 Dzik, J. 1999a Relationship between rates of speciation and phyletic evolution: Stratophenetic data on pelagic conodont chordates and benthic ostracods. Geobios 32, 205-221.
 Dzik, J. 1999d. The Ordovician of the Holy Cross Mountains. Excursion 1, day 1, stop 1: Mójcza. Excursion 1, day 1, stop 2: Zalesie Nowe. Excursion 1, day 2, stop 4: Międzygórz. In: J. Dzik, U. Lindemann, & T. Heuse (eds) International Symposium on the Ordovician System, ISOS Prague 1999, Pre-Conference Fieldtrip. Excursion Guide Poland and Germany 3-13, 18-23.
 Dzik, J. 1999e. Organic membranous skeleton of the Precambrian metazoans from Namibia. Geology 27, 519-522.
 Dzik, J. 1999f. Evolutionary origin of asymmetry in early metazoan animals. In: G. Palyi, C. Zucchi, & L. Caglioti (eds) Advances in Biochirality 153-190. Elsevier Science S.A.
 Dzik, J. 1999g. Evolution of the Late Ordovician high-latitude conodonts and dating of Gondwana glaciations. Bolletino della Societa Paleontologica Italiana 37, 237-253.
 Simonetta, A.M., Pucci, A., & Dzik, J. 1999. Hypotheses on the origin and early evolution of chordates in the light of recent zoological and palaeontological evidence. Italian Journal of Zoology 66, 99-119. 
 Dzik, J. & Ivantsov, A. Y. 1999. An asymmetric segmented organism from the Vendian of Russia and the status of the Dipleurozoa. Historical Biology 13, 255-268.
 Dzik, J. 2000. The origin of the mineral skeleton in chordates. Evolutionary Biology 31, 105-154. 
 Dzik, J., Sulej, T., Kaim, A., and Niedźwiedzki, R. 2000. Late Triassic graveyard of large Triassic tetrapods in the Opole Silesia. Przegląd Geologiczny 48, 226-235.
 Dzik, J. 2001. A new Paleorhinus fauna in the early Late Triassic of Poland. Journal of Vertebrate Paleontology 21, 625-627.
 Dzik, J. & Gaździcki, A. 2001. The Eocene expansion of nautilids to high latitudes. Palaeogeography, Palaeoclimatology, Palaeoecology 172, 297-312.
 Dzik, J. 2002. Early diversification of organisms in the fossil record. In: G. Palyi, C. Zucchi, & L. Caglioti (eds) Fundamentals of Life 219-248. Elsevier Science S.A., Paris.
 Dzik, J. 2002. Possible ctenophoran affinities of the Precambrian “sea-pen” Rangea. Journal of Morphology 252, 315-334
 Dzik, J. Ivantsov, A.Yu. 2002. Internal anatomy of a new Precambrian dickinsoniid dipleurozoan from northern Russia. Neues Jahrbuch für Geologie und Paläontologie, Monatshefte
 Dzik, J. 2002. Emergence and collapse of the Frasnian conodont and ammonoid communities in the Holy Cross Mountains, Poland. Acta Palaeontologica Polonica 47, 565-650.
 Dzik, J. 2003. Early Cambrian lobopodian sclerites and associated fossils from Kazakhstan. Palaeontology 46, 1-20.
 Dzik, J. 2003. Anatomical information content in the Ediacaran fossils and their possible zoological affinities. Integrative and Comparative Biology 43, 114-126
 Dzik, J. 2003. A beaked herbivorous archosaur with dinosaur affinities from the early Late Triassic of Poland. Journal of Vertebrate Paleontology 23, 556-574
 Dzik, J. 2004. Anatomy and relationships of the Early Cambrian worm Myoscolex. Zoologica Scripta 32, 56-69.
 Dzik, J., Ivantsov, A.Yu., & Deulin, Y.V. 2005. Oldest shrimp and associated phyllocarid from the Lower Devonian of northern Russia. Zoological Journal of the Linnean Society 142, 83-90.
 Dzik, J. 2005a. The chronophyletic approach: stratophenetics facing an incomplete fossil record. Special Papers in Palaeontology 73, 159-183.
 Dzik, J. 2005b. Behavioral and anatomical unity of the earliest burrowing animals and the cause of the ‘Cambrian explosion’. Paleobiology 31, 507-525.
 Rolfe W.D.I. & Dzik, J. 2006. Angustidontus, a Late Devonian pelagic predatory crustacean. Transactions of the Royal Society of Edinburgh: Earth Sciences 97, 75-96.
 Dzik, J. 2007. The Verdun Syndrome: Simultaneous origin of protective armor and infaunal shelters at the Precambrian-Cambrian transition. In: P. Vickers-Rich & P. Komarower (eds) The Rise and Fall of the Ediacaran Biota. Geological Society, London, Special Publications 286, 405-414.
 Dzik, J. & Sulej, T. 2007. A review of the early Late Triassic Krasiejów biota from Silesia, Poland. Palaeontologia Polonica 64, 3-27.
 Dzik, J. 2008. Taphonomy and anatomy of the Ediacarans. Geophysical Research Abstracts, Vol. 10, EGU2008-A-01357, 2008
 Dzik, J. 2008. Evolution of morphogenesis in 360 million year old conodont chordates calibrated in days. Evolution and Development 10, 769-777
 Servais, T. (co-ordinator), Dzik, J., Fatka, O. Heuse, T., Vecoli, M. & Verniers, J. 2008. Ordovician. In T. McCann (ed.) The Geology of Central Europe. Volume 1. Precambrian and Palaeozoic. 203-248. The Geological Society, London.
 Dzik, J., Sulej, T., & Niedźwiedzki, G. 2008. A dicynodont-theropod association in the latest Triassic of Poland. Acta Palaeontologica Polonica 53, 733-738
 Dzik, J. 2008. Gill structure and relationships of the Triassic cycloid crustaceans. Journal of Morphology 269, 1501-1519
 Dzik, J. 2009. Conodont affinity of the enigmatic Carboniferous chordate Conopiscius. Lethaia 42, 31-38
 Dzik, J. 2010. Brachiopod identity of the alleged Late Cambrian monoplacophoran ancestors of cephalopods. Malacologia 52, 97-113.
 Piechowski, R. & Dzik, J. 2010. The axial skeleton of Silesaurus opolensis. Journal of Vertebrate Paleontology 30, 1127-1141.
 Dzik, J., Sulej, T., Niedzwiedzki, G., & Malakhov, D.V. 2010. Possible link connecting reptilian scales with avian feathers from the early Late Jurassic of Kazakhstan. Historical Biology 22, 394-402. 
 Dzik, J. 2011. The xenusian-to-anomalocaridid transition within the lobopodians. Bolletino della Società Paleontologica Italiana 50, 65-74.
 Skawina, A. & Dzik, J. 2011. Umbonal musculature and relationships of the Late Triassic filibranch unionoid bivalves. Zoological Journal of the Linnean Society 163, 863-883.
 Dzik, J. 2011. Possible Ediacaran ancestry of the halkieriids. Palaeontographica Canadiana 31, 205-217.
 Dzik, J. & Moskalenko, T.A. 2016. Problematic scale-like fossils from the Ordovician of Siberia with possible affinities to vertebrates. Neues Jahrbuch für Geologie und Paläontologie - Abhandlungen, 279(3), pages 251–260,

External links 
 
 Instytut Paleobiologii PAN – Jerzy Dzik (Polish)

Polish paleontologists
Conodont specialists
1950 births
Living people